The Billionth Barrel Monument is a monument located in Seria, Brunei.

History 
The monument was built in 1991. It was commemorated by Sultan Hassanal Bolkiah on 18 July 1991. The monument commemorates the production of the billionth barrel of oil produced in the onshore oil field in Seria.

Location 
The monument is located near the S-1, the first well discovered in Seria oil field. The well was discovered by Brunei Shell Petroleum in 1929. The monument is located 38 meters from S-1, which is now located on the beach. The only marker that remains of S-1 is a corroded steel bar.

Design 
On an elevated square, there are five pipes that form an arch structure that is crowned by a gilded coat of arms. The five pipes are reminiscent of the Five Pillars of Islam and the floor tiles are designed according to Islamic models.

The monument was designed by a local architect.

References 

Belait District
Monuments and memorials in Brunei